The Dream (French: Le rêve) is a 1931 French drama film directed by Jacques de Baroncelli and starring Simone Genevois, Jaque Catelain and Jean Joffre. It is based on the 1888 novel of the same title by Emile Zola.

It was shot at  Pathé's Joinville Studios in Paris. The film's sets were designed by the art director Robert Gys.

Cast
 Simone Genevois as Angélique
 Jaque Catelain as Félicien
 Charles Le Bargy as Monsieur de Hautecoeur
 Jean Joffre as L'abbé Cornille
 Germaine Dermoz as Hubertine
 Gilberte Savary as Angélique enfant
 Paul Amiot as Hubert
 Raymond Galle as Le médecin

References

Bibliography 
 Goble, Alan. The Complete Index to Literary Sources in Film. Walter de Gruyter, 1999.
 Slavin, David Henry . Colonial Cinema and Imperial France, 1919–1939: White Blind Spots, Male Fantasies, Settler Myths. JHU Press, 2001.

External links 
 

1931 films
French drama films
French black-and-white films
1931 drama films
1930s French-language films
Films directed by Jacques de Baroncelli
Films based on French novels
Pathé films
Films shot at Joinville Studios
1930s French films

fr:Le Rêve (film, 1931)